The 2010 1000 km of Zhuhai was an auto race held on 5–7 November 2010 at the Zhuhai International Circuit in Zhuhai, China. The 1000 km of Zhuhai was the first race in China to be run under Automobile Club de l'Ouest (ACO) regulations.  The race served as the final round of the 2010 Intercontinental Le Mans Cup.  Peugeot won the race and secured the Team and Manufacturer titles in the Intercontinental Cup, defeating Audi.  Ferrari and AF Corse also secured the GT2 Intercontinental Cup, despite finishing third in the class behind the BMW Team Schnitzer entry.

This race also marked the first time that the ACO allowed competitors from the FIA GT3 category to compete alongside their normal categories, with Hong Kong-based KK Performance winning the inaugural race for the GTC class. This was also the last appearance of GT1 category in ACO-sanctioned series.

Qualifying

Qualifying result
Pole position winners in each class are marked in bold.

Race

Race result
Class winners in bold.  Cars failing to complete 70% of winner's distance marked as Not Classified (NC).

See also
Asian Le Mans Series

References

External links

 Asian Le Mans Series

! colspan="3" style="background: #FFFFFF;" |Intercontinental Le Mans Cup
|- style="text-align:center;" 
|width="35%" align="center"|Previous race:Petit Le Mans
|width="30%" style="text-align: center;"|2010 season
|width="35%" align="center"|Next race:none

Zhuhai
6 Hours of Zhuhai
Zhuhai
2010 Intercontinental Le Mans Cup season